Cedarville may refer to:

Places
United States
 Cedarville, Arkansas
 Cedarville, California
 Cedarville, Illinois
 Cedarville, Indiana
 Cedarville, Kentucky
 Cedarville, Maryland
 Cedarville, Massachusetts
 Cedarville, Michigan
 Cedarville, Missouri
 Cedarville, New Jersey
 Cedarville, New York
 Cedarville, Ohio
Cedarville University
 Cedarville, Pennsylvania
 Cedarville Township, Michigan
 Cedarville Township, Greene County, Ohio
 Cedarville, Stevens County, Washington
 Cedarville, Whatcom County, Washington
 Cedarville, West Virginia
 Cedarville, Wisconsin

Canada
Cedarville, Grey County, Ontario
Cedarville, Simcoe County, Ontario

South Africa
Cedarville, Eastern Cape

Other uses 
SS Cedarville, a lake freighter that sank in 1965 in the U.S./Canadian Great Lakes